Chestnut Hill is an unincorporated community in Henderson County, North Carolina, United States. It lies at an elevation of 2,667 feet (813 m). The community is part of the Asheville Metropolitan Statistical Area.

References

Unincorporated communities in Henderson County, North Carolina
Asheville metropolitan area
Unincorporated communities in North Carolina